Schizella is a genus of snipe flies of the family Rhagionidae. They are delicate flies from 3.7 to 6.3 mm, with long, thin legs, and the  thorax is brown to orange-brown with blue, purple, or golden-coloured setae.

This genus is only known from the Philippines.

Species
Schizella furcicornis Bezzi, 1916
Schizella pulchrina Frey, 1954
Schizella woodleyi Kerr, 2004

References

Rhagionidae
Brachycera genera
Diptera of Asia
Endemic fauna of the Philippines
Taxa named by Mario Bezzi